The Shire of Wandering is a local government area in the Wheatbelt region of Western Australia, and, with a population of 444 as at the , is one of the nation's smallest. The Shire's seat of government is the town of Wandering.

History
The Wandering Road District was gazetted on 6 October 1874 out of land previously part of the Williams Road District.

On 1 July 1961, it became a shire following the enactment of the Local Government Act 1960, which reformed all remaining road districts into shires.

Wards
The Shire is undivided and is represented by seven councillors.

From 1941 until the 2009 elections, it was divided into four wards as follows:

 North Ward (two councillors)
 North East Ward (two councillors)
 South Ward (two councillors)
 Town Ward (one councillor)

Towns and localities
The towns and localities of the Shire of Wandering with population and size figures based on the most recent Australian census:

(* indicates locality is only partially located within this shire)

  Locality was accessed as part of North Bannister in the 2021 Australian census, no separate population data available.

Former towns
 Gleneagle
 Mooterdine

Population

Heritage-listed places
As of 2023, 32 places are heritage-listed in the Shire of Wandering, of which none are on the State Register of Heritage Places.

References

External links
 

Wandering